This is a list of diplomatic missions in Lebanon. At present, the capital city of Beirut hosts 71 embassies, 3 consulates, and 2 mission.

Embassies 
Beirut

Missions/Offices 
 (Representative Office)
 (Delegation)

Consulates-General/Consulates 
Beirut

Accredited embassies 
Resident in Cairo, Egypt

 
 
 

 

 

 
  
 

 
 

 

 

 

 

Resident in Damascus, Syria

Resident elsewhere

 (Amman)
(Amman)
 (Kuwait City)
 (Rome)
 (Rome)
 (Ankara)
 (Addis Ababa)
 (Paris)
 (Ankara)
 (Riyadh)
 (Valletta)
 (Ankara)
 (Amman)
 (Nicosia)
 (Kuwait City)
 (Riyadh)
 (Riyadh) 
 (Kuwait City)   
 (Ankara)
 (Abu Dhabi)
 (Paris)

Former embassies

See also 
 Foreign relations of Lebanon
 Visa requirements for Lebanese citizens

References

External links 
 Foreign Embassies and Consulates in Lebanon

List
Lebanon
Diplomatic missions